Edgar Warner Mann (November 18, 1851 – December 7, 1904) was an American lawyer and territorial legislator.

Born in the Town of Vienna, Wisconsin, Mann graduated from Beloit College in 1873 and received a law degree from the University of Wisconsin Law School in 1874. Mann then practiced law in Chippewa Falls, Wisconsin. In 1876, he moved to Cheyenne, Wyoming Territory. He served in the Wyoming Territorial Legislature, in the Wyoming Territorial House of Representatives, as a Republican, in 1879. He also served as register of the land office and as city and county attorney in Cheyenne. He died in Cheyenne, Wyoming.

Notes

1851 births
1904 deaths
Politicians from Chippewa Falls, Wisconsin
People from Vienna, Wisconsin
Politicians from Cheyenne, Wyoming
Beloit College alumni
University of Wisconsin Law School alumni
Wisconsin lawyers
Wyoming lawyers
Wisconsin Republicans
Wyoming Republicans
Members of the Wyoming Territorial Legislature
19th-century American politicians